The characters in the American animated television series SpongeBob SquarePants were created by artist, animator, and former marine biologist Stephen Hillenburg. The series chronicles the adventures of the title character and his various friends in the fictional underwater city of Bikini Bottom. Most characters are anthropomorphic sea creatures based on real-life species. Many of the characters' designs originated in an unpublished educational comic book titled The Intertidal Zone, which Hillenburg created in 1989.

SpongeBob SquarePants features the voices of Tom Kenny, Bill Fagerbakke, Rodger Bumpass, Clancy Brown, Mr. Lawrence, Jill Talley, Carolyn Lawrence, Mary Jo Catlett and Lori Alan. Most one-off and background characters are voiced by Dee Bradley Baker, Sirena Irwin, Bob Joles, Mark Fite and Thomas F. Wilson. In addition to the series' regular cast, various celebrities from a wide range of professions have voiced guest characters and recurring roles.

The show's characters have received positive critical reception and attention from celebrities. They have made frequent appearances in media outside of the television show, including a theatrical film series, many video games, and two spin-off series. The characters have also been referenced and parodied throughout popular culture. The title character SpongeBob became a merchandising icon during the height of the show's second season and has seen continued commercial popularity.

Creation and conception
Stephen Hillenburg originally conceived early versions of the SpongeBob SquarePants characters in 1984, while he was teaching and studying marine biology at what is now the Orange County Marine Institute in Dana Point, California. During this period, Hillenburg became fascinated with animation, and wrote a comic book titled The Intertidal Zone starring various anthropomorphic forms of sea creatures, many of which would evolve into SpongeBob SquarePants characters, including "Bob the Sponge", who was the co-host of the comic and resembled an actual sea sponge as opposed to SpongeBob. In 1987, Hillenburg left the institute to pursue his dream of becoming an animator.

Patrick, Mr. Krabs, Pearl, and Squidward were the first other characters Hillenburg created for the show. Many of their characteristics were based on Hillenburg's experiences during his time at the Ocean Institute or inspired by the traits of their species. Patrick's personality embodies the nature of the starfish; according to Hillenburg, they look "dumb and slow" but are "very active and aggressive" in reality, like Patrick. Hillenburg drew inspiration from his former manager at a seafood restaurant while creating Mr. Krabs. According to him, this manager was redheaded, muscular, and a former army cook; these traits were all adapted into Krabs' character. His decision to design Pearl was influenced by his regular supervision of whale watches at the Ocean Institute, as well as by a cetacean skeleton at the institute. He drew Pearl with an oversized, almost geometric head as a reference to sperm whales having the largest brain size of any extant animal on Earth. He designed Squidward as an octopus because of the species' bulbous mantle; the octopus, he said, has "such a large bulbous head and Squidward thinks he's an intellectual, so of course he's gonna have [one]". Hillenburg drew Squidward with six tentacles because "it was really just simpler for animation to draw him with six legs instead of eight".

Several additions were made to the series' main cast before and after Hillenburg pitched the series to Nickelodeon; in his series bible, he added Sandy Cheeks, a squirrel clad in a diving suit, as a new friend of SpongeBob. Plankton and Karen were included in his bible but were not meant to make regular appearances; Plankton's voice actor Mr. Lawrence said that he "was only supposed to be in one or two episodes, but I was a writer on the show and I really liked this character". Following his first voice recording, Lawrence drafted some of his own ideas, hoping to "prove Plankton could survive as more than a one-note character". From then on, Plankton and Karen's roles in the series grew as Lawrence wrote ideas to give them more personality; notably, he decided to write Karen as Plankton's wife, rather than just his computer as was originally intended. They were both officially promoted to main cast members in the credits of the 2004 theatrical film, in which they play central roles.

Hillenburg added Mrs. Puff in response to a request by Nickelodeon that SpongeBob attend school. Nickelodeon executives initially wanted to make SpongeBob a child since their most successful cartoons at the time focused on young, school-age characters. Hillenburg stated that the network wanted SpongeBob to be like "Arnold [from Hey Arnold!] under the sea," but he told them, "No, that's not the show." As a compromise, he decided to put SpongeBob in a boat-driving school, allowing him to keep writing SpongeBob as an adult while also using the school as a main plot element. Showrunner Vincent Waller suggested that if Nickelodeon had creative control over SpongeBob, almost every episode would take place at Mrs. Puff's school, rather than at a variety of locations. The choice to make Mrs. Puff a pufferfish, who inflates into a ball when SpongeBob crashes, was made to evoke the appearance of car airbags.

Main characters

SpongeBob SquarePants

SpongeBob SquarePants (voiced by Tom Kenny, Antonio Raul Corbo as young SpongeBob in The SpongeBob Movie: Sponge on the Run) is a yellow anthropomorphic sea sponge who usually wears brown short pants, a white collared shirt, and a red tie. He lives in a pineapple house and is employed as a fry cook at a fast food restaurant called the Krusty Krab. He diligently attends Mrs. Puff's Boating School but has never passed; throughout the series, he tries his hardest on the exams but remains an unintentionally reckless boat driver. He is relentlessly optimistic and enthusiastic toward his job and his friends. SpongeBob's hobbies include catching jellyfish, blowing bubbles, playing with his best friend Patrick, and unintentionally irritating his neighbor Squidward. He first appears in "Help Wanted".

Patrick Star

Patrick Star (voiced by Bill Fagerbakke, Jack Gore as young Patrick in The SpongeBob Movie: Sponge on the Run) a pink starfish who lives under a rock and wears flowered swim trunks. His most prominent character trait is his extremely low intelligence. He is best friends with SpongeBob and often unknowingly encourages activities that get the two into trouble. While typically unemployed throughout the series, Patrick holds various short-term jobs as the storyline of each episode requires. He is generally slow and even-tempered but can sometimes get aggressive, much like real starfish, and occasionally performs feats of great strength.

Squidward Tentacles

Squidward Tentacles (voiced by Rodger Bumpass, Jason Maybaum as young Squidward in The SpongeBob Movie: Sponge on the Run) a turquoise Giant Pacific octopus with a large nose who works as a cashier at the Krusty Krab. He is SpongeBob's next-door neighbor with a dry, sarcastic sense of humor. His house is between SpongeBob's and Patrick's houses. He believes himself to be a talented artist and musician, but nobody else recognizes his abilities. He plays the clarinet and often paints self-portraits in different styles, which he hangs up around his moai house. Squidward frequently voices his frustration with SpongeBob, but he genuinely cares for him deep down. This has been revealed in the form of sudden confessions when Squidward is in a dire situation.

Mr. Krabs

Eugene Krabs (voiced by Clancy Brown) is a red crab who lives in an anchor-shaped house with his daughter Pearl, who is a whale. He dislikes spending money but will go to great lengths to make Pearl happy. Krabs owns and operates the Krusty Krab restaurant where SpongeBob works. He is self-content, cunning, and obsessed with the value and essence of money. He tends to worry more about his riches than about the needs of his employees. Having served in the navy, he loves sailing, whales, sea shanties, and talking like a pirate.

Plankton and Karen

Sheldon Plankton (voiced by Mr. Lawrence) and Karen Plankton (voiced by Jill Talley) are the owners of the Chum Bucket, an unsuccessful restaurant located across the street from the Krusty Krab. Their business is a commercial failure because they sell mostly inedible foods made from chum. Plankton is a small planktonic copepod and the self-proclaimed archenemy of Mr. Krabs. His ultimate goal is to steal Krabs' secret formula for Krabby Patties, run the Krusty Krab out of business, and take over the oceanic world, but he never permanently succeeds, usually due to either SpongeBob and/or Krabs' efforts, his own incompetence and immaturity, or his own small size (except, temporarily, in The SpongeBob SquarePants Movie). Plankton is a skilled inventor and possesses a Napoleon complex due to his short stature. Karen is Plankton's own invention, a waterproof supercomputer who is more competent that Plankton, being the brains behind most of his evil plans to steal Krabs' secret recipe. She is married to Plankton and usually takes residence in the Chum Bucket laboratory. Karen speaks with a pronounced Midwestern American accent.

Sandy Cheeks

Sandy Cheeks (voiced by Carolyn Lawrence, Presley Williams as young Sandy in The SpongeBob Movie: Sponge on the Run) is a squirrel from Texas who lives in an air-filled glass dome and wears a diving suit to breathe underwater. Whenever any aquatic creatures enter her home, they must wear helmets of water. Sandy works as a scientist, explorer, and inventor. She is a rodeo champion with a number of athletic interests, such as "sand-boarding" and karate. She speaks with a Southern drawl and uses typical Southern slang words and phrases.

Mrs. Puff

Mrs. Puff (voiced by Mary Jo Catlett) is a paranoid pufferfish who is SpongeBob's teacher at boating school, an underwater driver's education facility where students drive boats like cars. She wears a sailor suit and her school is a lighthouse. SpongeBob is Mrs. Puff's most dedicated student and knows the answer to every question on her written and oral exams, but always panics and crashes when he actually boards a vessel. She puffs up into a ball when she is scared or injured. As a running gag, she is frequently arrested by the police, usually due to her being responsible for SpongeBob when he causes destruction around Bikini Bottom during his boating test.

Pearl Krabs

Pearl Krabs (voiced by Lori Alan) is a teenage sperm whale and Mr. Krabs' daughter. She wants to fit in with her fish peers, but finds this impossible to do because of the large size inherent to her species. She will inherit the Krusty Krab from her father when she grows older, but is still in high school and does not yet have a job at the family business. Pearl's favorite activities are working at the Bikini Bottom Mall, using her father's credit card to buy anything that is in style, and listening to pop music.

Gary the Snail
Gary the Snail (vocal effects provided by Tom Kenny) is SpongeBob's pet sea snail who lives with him in their pineapple home and vocalizes like a cat. Other snails and SpongeBob can understand and talk to him. Depicted as a level-headed character, Gary often serves as a voice of reason and a foil to SpongeBob and solves problems that his owner cannot. He has a pink shell that is impossibly spacious on the inside.

Supporting characters

Patchy the Pirate
Patchy the Pirate (portrayed and voiced by Tom Kenny) is the host of the series' special episodes. He is a live-action pirate and the president of the fictional SpongeBob fan club. He lives in an unnamed suburb of Encino, Los Angeles, and segments hosted by him are often presented in a dual narrative with the animated stories. He made a special guest star appearance on Big Time Rush in the episode "Big Time Beach Party" with Carlos Pena Jr. and Logan Henderson.

Potty the Parrot
Potty the Parrot (voiced by Stephen Hillenburg in seasons 2–3, Paul Tibbitt from seasons 4–8, Mr. Lawrence from seasons 10-present) is Patchy's green pet parrot, depicted as a crudely-made puppet with googly eyes. The character's name is a reference to "Polly wants a cracker," a phrase often used for parrots to vocally mimic. Potty is obnoxious and often annoys or talks back to Patchy while he is trying to host an episode.

French Narrator
The French Narrator (voiced by Tom Kenny, portrayed by Dan Southworth in live-action appearances) is an oceanographer who films SpongeBob's world using a camera. He often introduces episodes from off screen or narrates the intertitles as if the series were a nature documentary about the ocean. He has a thick French accent as a reference to the distinctive speaking style of oceanographer and filmmaker Jacques Cousteau. He is normally only heard, but physically appears three times. In "No Free Rides", after being accidentally hit by SpongeBob during a driving test, his legs, which are wearing scuba diving fins, are visible. In "Feral Friends" and "SpongeBob's Big Birthday Blowout", he is shown in live action as a hard hat diver with his face obscured by his helmet and a red beanie hat on top, referencing the beanie hat Cousteau was widely known for wearing.

Mermaid Man and Barnacle Boy

Mermaid Man (voiced by Ernest Borgnine as an old man and a young man in "The Bad Guy Club for Villains", Adam West as a young man in "Back to the Past") and his sidekick Barnacle Boy (voiced by Tim Conway as an old man and a young man in "The Bad Guy Club for Villains", Burt Ward as a young man in "Back to the Past") are two elderly and partially senile superheroes who live in a retirement home and are stars of SpongeBob and Patrick's favorite television show. Mermaid Man is known for completely forgetting things and yelling a prolonged "EVIL!" whenever he hears the word, while Barnacle Boy seems to be the smarter, more sensible, and more irritable of the two. "Mermaid Man Begins" confirms that their given first names are Ernie and Tim, referencing the first names of their respective voice actors. Aquaman artist Ramona Fradon drew the characters' comic book adventures.

Since Borgnine and Conway's deaths in 2012 and 2019, both characters have been limited to cameo appearances without dialogue.

The Flying Dutchman
The Flying Dutchman (voiced by Brian Doyle-Murray) is an irritable, mischievous pirate ghost who glows green. He is named after the ghost ship of the same name. He haunts the seven seas because his unburied corpse was used as a window display. He collects souls as a Satan-like character and resides in a cavern containing Davy Jones' Locker, a literal locker stuffed with smelly socks that belong to Monkees singer Davy Jones, which within the series is analogous to Hell and occasionally mentioned as a curse word.

King Neptune
King Neptune (voiced by John O'Hurley in the TV series, Paul Tibbitt in "SpongeBob vs. The Patty Gadget") is a powerful, trident-wielding merman god who rules the sea, based on the Roman mythological deity of the same name. In the series, Neptune lives in a palace in Atlantis with his wife Amphitrite and son Triton. He is usually portrayed as arrogant and selfish, showing little sympathy for the sea's fish populace. Neptune has a mostly teal color scheme with a long auburn beard and hair. He wears gold wrist bands and a matching crown decorated with a scallop ornament, plus a gold belt bearing a seahorse emblem. This version was also known as Neptune XIV as seen when his portrait is shown in Squidward's briefly-redecorated room as seen in "Krusty Towers".

A different King Neptune is featured in The SpongeBob SquarePants Movie, voiced by Jeffrey Tambor. In the film, he resides near Bikini Bottom with his daughter Mindy and resembles a light green-skinned king with a robe, a shorter beard and hair, a domed crown to cover his bald spot, and powers limited to what can be exercised through his trident.

Larry the Lobster
Larry the Lobster (usually voiced by Mr. Lawrence and voiced by Bill Fagerbakke for a line in "MuscleBob BuffPants") is a lobster lifeguard, bodybuilder and workout fanatic who lifts weights. He is usually seen at Goo Lagoon alongside Scooter. He first appears in "Ripped Pants" and reappears in the spinoff Kamp Koral: SpongeBob's Under Years.

Harold and Margaret SquarePants
Mr. Harold SquarePants (voiced by Tom Kenny) and Mrs. Margaret SquarePants (voiced by Sirena Irwin) are SpongeBob's parents, who more closely resemble round sea sponges than SpongeBob. Harold is brown with glasses and a moustache, while Margaret is dark orange. They seem to live outside of Bikini Bottom, but still take the time to visit their son on occasion. They are proud of SpongeBob but embarrassed that he still does not have a driver's license.

Realistic Fish Head
The Realistic Fish head (voiced by Mr. Lawrence) is an announcer and news anchor fish, resembling a cut-out of a live-action tuna. He appears in the series' opening theme. He has been given various different names throughout the series and tie-in media; it is Mister Fish in SpongeBob's Nicktoon Summer Splash, Elaine in "The Great Patty Caper", Johnny in Battle for Bikini Bottom and Battle for Bikini Bottom – Rehydrated, and "T. McTrout" in Toonz2Nite commercials for Nicktoons UK.

Perch Perkins
Perch Perkins (voiced by Dee Bradley Baker) is a perch who works as a famous field news reporter. While the Realistic Fish Head only reports on television news programs, Perch makes physical appearances reporting about events that occur. He is normally purple with a dark purple coat with a black wig and headphones, although some episodes and Nicktoons MLB show him with an orange color scheme and a red coat.

Bubble Bass
Bubble Bass (voiced by Dee Bradley Baker) is an overweight green bass that first appeared in season 1. He is a nemesis of SpongeBob and is very picky about his food. Although initially dormant after Season 1, he began to appear far more frequently as a supporting character in Season 9, and he has even had a notable share of episodes focused on him in both protagonist and antagonist roles, such as "Swamp Mates".

Bikini Bottomites
The Bikini Bottomites are multicolored fish and other sea creatures who inhabit Bikini Bottom. They function as the series' background characters. They live in buildings made from metal ship funnels and use "boatmobiles," amalgamations of cars and boats, as a mode of transportation. Although the series uses a set sheet of about 150 designs for incidental characters, the Bikini Bottomites' voices and characterizations vary throughout their appearances. Several of them have been given names and play heightened roles in select episodes.

  (voiced by Mr. Lawrence) is a hapless brown fish townsperson who shouts "My leg!" as a running gag whenever there is havoc or destruction. He makes his first appearance in "Reef Blower", but his recurring line is not heard until "Boating School". Fred appears as a major character in the season 11 episode "My Leg!" where it is revealed that he enjoys staying at the hospital as he is in love with a nurse.
  (voiced by Dee Bradley Baker) is a bodybuilding orca and regular attendee at Goo Lagoon. He is normally silent but had speaking parts in "Ink Lemonade" and the game SpongeBob SquarePants: Lights, Camera, Pants!. 
  (voiced by Mr. Lawrence/Dee Bradley Baker/Clancy Brown) is a blue fish with a shark-like fin and spiked teeth. His character model is often used as an angry or troublemaking townsperson. His name is revealed in both "Have You Seen This Snail?" and in "Roller Cowards". His first appearance is in "Ripped Pants".
 Nat (voiced by Dee Bradley Baker/Tom Kenny) is a male yellow fish who is often seen as a bus driver. His first name is revealed in "Plankton's Regular", in which Karen pays him to become the Chum Bucket's first regular customer.
 Officer Nancy (voiced by Sirena Irwin/Jill Talley) and Officer John (voiced by Dee Bradley Baker/Thomas F. Wilson/Mr. Lawrence) are a pair of police officer fish in Bikini Bottom. They are committed to their jobs but often arrest or punish characters for insignificant reasons like littering or having no front license plate.
  (voiced by various actors from seasons 1—10 and by John Gegenhuber since season 11) is an elderly townsperson who lives at the Shady Shoals retirement home and is a common patron of the Krusty Krab. His appearance and job changed often throughout the first ten seasons. A country style banjo music usually plays whenever he appears. This music was confirmed as a theme song in the episode 'Friend or Foe' when elementary age Eugene Krabs states, "I'd know that theme song anywhere, it's Old Man Jenkins!"  One of his critical appearances is in "The Sponge Who Could Fly" wherein he plays a farmer, a sailor, and finally, a human cannonball. In season 11, the series' staff decided on a finite design for Old Man Jenkins, and the actor John Gegenhuber began to consistently voice him.
  (voiced by Tom Kenny) is an elderly fish who is often seen at the Krusty Krab. He was originally one of the many designs of Old Man Jenkins before the skinny green design of the character became the definite version of the character – since then, the production crew had referred to this former version of Old Man Jenkins as "Old Man Walker". At one time, he mistakes SpongeBob for a box of Bran Flakes.
  (voiced by Rodger Bumpass/Dee Bradley Baker/Mr. Lawrence) is a doctor who works as a physician at the Bikini Bottom Hospital and as a traveling veterinarian for pet snails. He has a calm demeanor and a deep, suave voice. SpongeBob was initially scared of visiting his office in "Suds," but later faces his fears and discovers he likes visiting the doctor. Although he has had many designs, he is often seen as a purple fish in doctor's attire.
  (voiced by Carlos Alazraqui) is a fish who enjoys surfing and is often seen at Goo Lagoon. He speaks like a stereotypical southern Californian and often calls SpongeBob "dude." He dies after being drowned at Goo Lagoon and becomes an angel in the second-season episode "Bubble Buddy", but returns unharmed for future episodes.
  (voiced by Sirena Irwin/Carolyn Lawrence/Jill Talley/Mary Jo Catlett) is a dark grey fish with white hair. She has variously been portrayed as a friend of Pearl and a bank teller. 
  (voiced by Mr. Lawrence) is a green fish who wears a purple shirt, although he has appeared with other color schemes. He plays a heightened role in the episode "Chocolate with Nuts," in which he goes ballistic and chases SpongeBob and Patrick after they attempt to sell him chocolate bars at his doorstep, since he really wants to buy it all.

Jellyfish
The jellyfish (vocal effects by Tom Kenny) are wild animals who reside in Jellyfish Fields, a meadow in Bikini Bottom, and have a strong affinity for music. Within the series, jellyfish behave like sentient insects, squirt jelly, buzz and swarm like bees, and can sting their enemies with electric shocks that leave painful welts.

Other characters

Recurring and guest characters
  (voiced by Dee Snider) is the owner of a snail shell emporium in "Shell Shocked". He initially pretends to have an angry demeanor as a marketing stint for his store's commercials, but becomes truly infuriated when SpongeBob accidentally destroys every shell in his emporium.
  (voiced by Betty White) is the owner of Grandma's Apron, the store where Pearl goes to work in "Mall Girl Pearl". An older woman, Beatrice convinces Pearl not to let her teenage friends make fun of her job.
  (voiced by Bob Barker) is the director of an animal rescue center where snails escaped from to find SpongeBob in "Sanctuary!" He delivers the "have your pets spayed and neutered" line Barker used to close his game show The Price Is Right.
  (voiced by Brad Abrell) is a humanoid bubble created by SpongeBob in "Bubble Buddy". His apparent inanimateness annoys other people of Bikini Bottom, but he is later revealed to be a sentient being before moving out of the town in a taxi-shaped bubble. He later returns in the season 8 episode "Bubble Buddy Returns", having been found to live in Bubbletown, a city made completely out of bubbles.
  (voiced by Dee Bradley Baker) is a seal who is popular among Goo Lagoon beachgoers for his tanned skin and golden caramel brown bones. In "Sun Bleached", he holds parties during the night that only permits those with tanned skin to enter, the highest level of which is bleached skin. He is a parody of George Hamilton.
  (voiced by Jeff Garlin) is a giant, bowtie-wearing hamster from the eponymous episode who can only be seen whenever someone ingests a rotten Krabby Patty.
  (voiced by Charles Nelson Reilly in his first appearance, Tom Kenny in later appearances) is a villain against Mermaid Man and Barnacle Boy. He is a giant brown bubble with a face that is vulnerable to pointy items. The Dirty Bubble was one of the founders of the evil organization E.V.I.L. (short for Every Villain is Lemons). He's a spoof of Batman's foe Joker.
  (voiced by Paul Tibbitt) is a drawing created by SpongeBob in his image using a human pencil, which is seemingly able to animate anything it draws. He speaks through unintelligible phrases. He appears in "Frankendoodle". He returned later in "Doodle Dimension", torturing SpongeBob and Patrick in a doodling dimension. He also featured as the main villain to defeat in the Drawn to Life: SpongeBob SquarePants Edition video game. In "Captain Pipsqueak", DoodleBob made a cameo among the villains auditioning to join E.V.I.L.
  (voiced by Thomas F. Wilson) is a green flounder who had several silent cameos in various SpongeBob SquarePants (season 1) episodes before appearing as the new student at Mrs. Puff's Boating School in "The Bully". He wants to kick SpongeBob's "butt" for no apparent reason and SpongeBob takes it as if Flats wants to murder him.
  (voiced by Gene Shalit) is a food critic who critiques the Krusty Krab in "The Krusty Sponge." He negatively reviews every aspect of the restaurant except for SpongeBob. In response to Scallop's review, Mr. Krabs exploits SpongeBob's newfound popularity by theming the Krusty Krab around SpongeBob. After Mr. Krabs got arrested by the health inspector for what his Spongy Patties did to its consumers, Gene was among the members of the jury at Mr. Krabs' trial where he tells the judge that they find him guilty of all charges. He is modeled and characterized after his voice actor, a real-life book and film critic.
  (voiced by Ian McShane) is the leader of a band of Vikings who kidnap SpongeBob and Squidward in "Dear Vikings". Except for himself, all of his crewmen are named "Olaf". In "Captain Pipsqueak", Gordon made a cameo among the villains auditioning to join E.V.I.L.
  (voiced by Amy Poehler) is an elderly fish who appears in "Have You Seen This Snail?". She finds snails and force-feeds them so that she can eat them and lock their shells in a closet. She adopts Gary, who was lost in an alley, as her latest victim, but he manages to escape.
  (voiced by Johnny Depp) is a legendary human-like surfer who appears in "SpongeBob SquarePants vs. The Big One". He teaches SpongeBob and his friends how to surf so they can go back home and fend off from a legendary tidal wave known as the Big One.
  (voiced by Patton Oswalt) is the Krusty Krab's original fry cook, as revealed in "The Original Fry Cook". His cooking is legendary throughout Bikini Bottom, and he is shown to be an even better chef than SpongeBob. Jim left the Krusty Krab after Mr. Krabs declined to provide him with a higher salary.
  (voiced by Biz Markie) is a gray tomcat from the eponymous episode who claims he can hold his breath underwater. He is idolized by SpongeBob until it is realized that Kenny requires an oxygen tank to breathe. After the ruse was exposed by Sandy, SpongeBob got him to continue his goals by putting him in one of Sandy's diving suits.
  (voiced by David Bowie), also referred to as LRH, is the king of Atlantis in "SpongeBob's Atlantis SquarePantis". He invites SpongeBob and his friends for a visit to Atlantis after they find the lost piece of the coin, but eventually regrets it since they (especially Patrick) end up popping the longest living bubble accidentally with a camera flash.
  (voiced by John Rhys-Davies in the first appearance, Bob Joles in later appearances) is a villain against Mermaid Man and Barnacle Boy. Man Ray has a man's body and a helmet shaped to look like a manta ray's head, which hides the fact that he does not have a head. He is a spoof of Aquaman's  arch enemy, Black Manta. Man Ray retires as a supervillain in his first appearance, however he later goes back to being a villain where he even became a founder of E.V.I.L. (short for Every Villain is Lemons).
  (voiced by Pat Morita) is an old karate master who appears in "Karate Island." He is actually a scammer who wants people to invest in his condominium project, disguising it as the "King of Karate" crowning that he presents to SpongeBob.
  (voiced by Mark Hamill) is a supervillain moth and an enemy of Mermaid Man and Barnacle Boy who appears in "Night Light". Even though he is minuscule, he has the strength to carry both SpongeBob's house and a lighthouse.
  (voiced by Alton Brown) is the presenter of the popular lifestyle television show, House Fancy. He is pending on an award for Best Architecture during the episode that features Squilliam's house; he eventually gives it to Squidward due to the "creative" design of his ruined house.
  (voiced by Victoria Beckham) is King Neptune's wife and Triton's mother. She is worried by her son's attitude of not wanting to inherit the throne.
  (voiced by Sebastian Bach) is the teenage son of King Neptune who appears in "The Clash of Triton". He initially wants to be a normal fish like everyone else, but his father convinces him otherwise.
  (voiced by Gilbert Gottfried) is the proprietor of the Slop Pail restaurant seen in "The Hankering". Mr. Krabs frequents the establishment until Sal decides to close it down permanently so he can pursue an acting career.
  makes several appearances throughout the series, portrayed in live-action form by series writer Michael Patrick Bell in "Christmas Who?", then in claymation by John Goodman for "It's a SpongeBob Christmas!". Lewis Black took over the role for later seasons, with Santa appearing traditionally animated and for a Kamp Koral episode in CGI. The Black version is generally annoyed by SpongeBob's antics, referring to him as "a menace".
 The  (vocal effects provided by Dee Bradley Baker) is a creature that appears in "The Camping Episode". It is depicted as a giant fish with the head of a bear and claws on its fins. SpongeBob and Patrick try to convince Squidward that the Sea Bear exists, but Squidward refuses to believe in the creature until it attacks him repeatedly when he did things that attract a Sea Bear like playing his clarinet badly, wearing a sombrero in a goofy fashion, stomping on the ground (Sea Bears take that as a challenge), waving around a flashlight (flashlights are its natural prey), eating cubed and sliced cheese, and screeching like a chimpanzee. Sea Bears also hate it when someone runs, limps, or crawls away from it. Only an Anti-Sea Bear circle can repel a sea-bear. On a related note, the sound of a Sea Bear attack can attract a Sea Rhinoceros.
  (voiced by Gene Simmons) is a lizard-like sea monster who appears in "20,000 Patties Under the Sea". After having slept for 79 years, he demands for SpongeBob and Patrick to sell him food in exchange for giant dollar bills.
  (voiced by Robin Sachs) is a strict drill sergeant shark who temporarily replaces Mrs. Puff as the teacher at boating school in "Mrs. Puff, You're Fired". He is said to be the strictest driving instructor in the sea, but even he cannot teach SpongeBob to drive successfully.
  (voiced by Henry Winkler), Lonnie (voiced by Michael McKean), Ronnie (voiced by Clancy Brown) and Donnie (voiced by David Lander) are a street gang of sharks who appear in the episode "Sharks vs. Pods", in which SpongeBob joins them. They are actually dancers rather than fighters and are rivals to Squidward's gang, a group of octopuses called the Pods.
  is Plankton's pet amoeba, who lives in the Chum Bucket with him and Karen. Spot behaves similarly to a puppy, is a good retriever, and can grow very large when he needs to protect his owner. He first appears in the season 9 episode "Plankton's Pet," and reappears in several episodes from season 11 onward.
  (voiced by Dee Bradley Baker) is an octopus and Squidward Tentacles' arrogant, wealthy arch-rival, who has succeeded in everything Squidward has only dreamed of doing. He owns a four-story mansion with an expansive garden on the rooftop. He appears in six episodes throughout the first seven seasons. Alternate versions of him appear in "Back to the Past" and "Code Yellow", but he has not made a physical appearance since "Keep Bikini Bottom Beautiful".
 The  (voiced by Thomas F. Wilson) is a criminal fish who appears in "SpongeBob Meets the Strangler". He is detained for repeatedly strangling someone and promises to strangle SpongeBob when the latter has him arrested. He escapes from jail and pretends to be a bodyguard to get close to SpongeBob, but SpongeBob's behavior annoys him to the point where he would rather be back in prison. In "Captain Pipsqueak", the Tattletale Strangler" made a cameo among the villains auditioning to join E.V.I.L.
 The  (voiced by R. Lee Ermey) is the head prison warden of the Inferno Island prison, appearing in "The Inmates of Summer". His demeanor is a stereotype of a drill sergeant: strict, demanding, and always speaking in a loud tone. This portrayal is reminiscent of Ermey's performance as Gunnery Sergeant Hartman in Stanley Kubrick's Full Metal Jacket.

Film characters
  (voiced by Scarlett Johansson) is King Neptune's daughter. She is Patrick's love interest. She is a motherly and friendly person and a very good friend of SpongeBob and Patrick. She appears in The SpongeBob SquarePants Movie. She isn't mentioned in the TV series, but does appear in the special "SpongeBob's Big Birthday Blowout".
  (voiced by Alec Baldwin in the film, Clancy Brown in the TV series) is a hitman hired by Plankton to assassinate SpongeBob and Patrick before they are able to retrieve King Neptune's crown from Shell City. Before he manages to do that however he is first stomped by the Cyclops and then hit by a pier. He only appeared in The SpongeBob SquarePants Movie and made a speaking cameo in "Captain Pipsqueak" where he was the receptionist for E.V.I.L.
  (performed by Aaron Hendry, vocal effects provided by Neil Ross) is a marine diver who is always seen wearing an atmospheric diving suit and helmet, even when not underwater, and never talks but only grunts appearing only in The SpongeBob SquarePants Movie. He is actually a normal adult man; however, because humans tower virtually all sea life, Mindy describes him as "the worst of all hazards". He is the owner of "Shell City", which is really the name of a seaside gift and souvenir shop.
  (portrayed by Antonio Banderas) is a pirate who, upon discovering a book capable of rewriting reality, steals the Krabby Patty formula to open up a fast food drive-in while also changing Bikini Bottom into a wasteland. He appears in The SpongeBob Movie: Sponge Out of Water.
  (voiced by Paul Tibbitt (US)/Joe Sugg (UK)/Robert Irwin (Australia)) is an innocent seagull that listens to the stories of Burger-Beard. He appears in The SpongeBob Movie: Sponge Out of Water.
  (voiced by Matt Berry in the film, Jeff Bennett in the video game) is a god-like bottlenose dolphin who is the overseer of the universe, watching them from a triangular building in outer space. SpongeBob and Plankton accidentally end up in his audience while using Karen's time machine in The SpongeBob Movie: Sponge Out of Water.
  (voiced by Matt Berry) is the ruler of the seven seas who resides in Atlantic City and is much different from King Neptune. He uses snails' slime as face cream to look younger, which is the reason he kidnapped SpongeBob's pet snail Gary once he was all out of snails. He only appeared in The SpongeBob Movie: Sponge on the Run.
  (voiced by Reggie Watts) is King Poseidon's assistant. He appears in The SpongeBob Movie: Sponge on the Run.
  (portrayed by Keanu Reeves) is a tumbleweed with a human face who helps SpongeBob on his quest to save Gary. He appears in The SpongeBob Movie: Sponge on the Run.
  (portrayed by Danny Trejo) is the leader of vampire cowboy zombies whom SpongeBob and Patrick encountered in their dream. He appears in The SpongeBob Movie: Sponge on the Run.

Spin-off characters
They are a pair of narwhals who live in the Kelp Forest. The siblings have crossed over into the main series on two occasions: the episodes "Something Narwhal This Way Comes" and "Upturn Girls".
 The  (voiced by Brad Garrett impersonating Rodney Dangerfield) is a sea monster in Kamp Koral: SpongeBob's Under Years that was seen living in the lake at Kamp Koral where he is shown to have a comedic side. He later crossed over into the main series where he appeared at the end of "Abandon Twits".
Cecil works at the Undersea Space Center while Bunny works from home.
  (voiced by Jill Talley) is a purple squid. She was first introduced in "Goons on the Moon" as a teenage friend of Pearl. In the spin-off The Patrick Star Show, she is Patrick's adopted sister and the producer of Patrick's imaginary talk show.
  (voiced by Dana Snyder) is Patrick's grandfather and Cecil's father in The Patrick Star Show. He is the smartest member of the Star family.
  (vocal effects provided by Tom Kenny) is a sea urchin who is the Star family's pet.
  (vocal effects provided by Dee Bradley Baker) is a sentient toilet.
  (vocal effects provided by Jill Talley) is a sea bunny. While often shown to be feuding with Ouchie, they get along well when they are with Tinkle.

Families and ancestors
  (voiced by John DiMaggio) is SpongeBob's cousin who bullied him during their childhoods. In his lone appearance, Blackjack was imprisoned for littering but has since been released.
  (voiced by Christopher Guest) is SpongeBob's cousin who appears solely in the episode "Stanley S. SquarePants". SpongeBob receives Stanley in a package sent by his Uncle Clem, who is relieved to have sent Stanley, since he would destroy anything he touches. True to this, despite SpongeBob trying to teach him, Stanley constantly destroys everything and almost makes SpongeBob lose his job.
  (voiced by Garnett Sailor) is SpongeBob's uncle who only appears in the episode "BlackJack". He is a retired police captain and lives right next to SpongeBob's cousin, BlackJack. In the episode, SpongeBob goes to his house to help him stop BlackJack from torturing SpongeBob's parents. However, he can't hear over the lawnmower and thinks SpongeBob wants to help him mow the lawn. It goes on like this for other noisy objects such as a blender, a radio with static, and a phonograph. When he finally hears the news, he drives SpongeBob over to BlackJack's house, but he warns SpongeBob.
  (voiced by Marion Ross) is SpongeBob's paternal grandmother. She spoils SpongeBob whenever he visits her house with cookies, milk, sweaters, and bedtime stories, even though it can embarrass SpongeBob.
  and Margie Star are Patrick's parents in the original series. Their identities are temporarily taken by another starfish couple named Marty and Janet in "I'm with Stupid". In "Rule of Dumb", it is revealed that Herb is a brother of Gary's father, Sluggo, making Patrick and Gary first cousins. The characters were later dropped when Cecil Star and Bunny Star were created.
  (voiced by Rodger Bumpass in most appearances), [[Dee Bradley Baker in "Fools in April") is Squidward's elderly mother. In earlier episodes, she only appears as hallucinations tormenting Squidward, but later appears in person in "Krusty Towers". She lives in a moai like Squidward, but with a curly hair-like structure on its roof and earring-like balls hanging from the sides.
  (voiced by Tom Kenny) is Squidward's father who was mentioned a lot before apeparing in "Kamp Kow".
  (voiced by Mary Jo Catlett in "Chum Fricasse", Cree Summer in The Patrick Star Show) is Squidward's paternal grandmother. She was originally mentioned in "Sandy's Rocket" before appearing in person in "Chum Fricasse" where Mr. Krabs tipped her off about Squidward and Plankton misusing her famous chum fricasse recipe by not letting it cook for 24 hours and had the customers wreck the Chum Bucket in retaliation. In The Patrick Star Show, Grandma Tentacles is shown to be the Star family's neighbor.
  (voiced by Paul Tibbitt in season 2–3, Sirena Irwin in season 4–6) is Mr. Krabs' overbearing mother who still treats him slightly like a child. She is a friend of Old Man Jenkins. She first appears in "Sailor Mouth" and has been mostly retired from the show, aside from a cameo in "Lame and Fortune." Although her name it is not officially mentioned in the series, she is referred to as "Betsy" in some merchandising.
  (voiced by Dennis Quaid) is Mr. Krabs' paternal grandfather who is a pirate. In "Grandpappy the Pirate", he visits his grandson, thinking that the latter is also a pirate instead of the owner of a restaurant. Mr. Krabs tries not to disappoint Redbeard by disguising the Krusty Krab as a pirate ship, pretending Pearl is a sea monster, and dressing his employees as sailors.
  (voiced by Laraine Newman) is Plankton's grandmother.
  and Primitive Star (voiced by Tom Kenny and Bill Fagerbakke) are the earliest known ancestors of SpongeBob and Patrick, who appear in the episode "SB-129" when Squidward time-travels to the past. Upon seeing the two of them electrocuting themselves with a jellyfish, Squidward inadvertently teaches them the sport of Jellyfishing, which results in Squidward being documented as the inventor of Jellyfishing when he returns to the present. They also seem to strongly dislike Squidward's clarinet music, as they ruthlessly chase down Squidward upon hearing it. The scene where Primitive Sponge and Primitive Star are confronted by Squidward upon noticing them torturing themselves with the jellyfish, particularly, the pose struck by Primitive Sponge, has become an internet meme, referred to as "SpongeGar" (which was actually the name given to another of SpongeBob's primitive ancestors in the episode "Ugh").
 , Patar, and Squog (voiced by Tom Kenny, Bill Fagerbakke, and Rodger Bumpass) are SpongeBob, Patrick, and Squidward's neolithic ancestors who appear in "Ugh." While still not being able to speak intelligibly, they are more advanced than the primitive ancestors in "SB-129" as they are shown to use stone tools and fire. Also appearing in the episode are Primitive Gary (voiced by Tom Kenny), Gary's gigantic ancestor and SpongeGar's pet, and Primitive Krabs (voiced by Clancy Brown), Mr. Krabs' tiny ancestor who repeatedly chants "money."
  and Patron (voiced by Tom Kenny and Bill Fagerbakke) are SpongeBob and Patrick's robotic descendants who appear in "SB-129". SpongeTron has 486 clones, each one named after a letter of the English alphabet from 2,000 years in the future, while Patron has two heads.
 , Pecos Patrick, Hopalong Tentacles, William Krabs, Polene Puff, and Dead Eye Plankton (voiced by Tom Kenny, Bill Fagerbakke, Rodger Bumpass, Clancy Brown, Mary Jo Catlett, and Mr. Lawrence) are the main characters' wild west ancestors who appear in "Pest of the West". They lived in the town of Bikini Gulch and frequented an old-fashioned bar version of the Krusty Krab called the Krusty Kantina.
 , King Krabs, Princess Pearl, Dark Knight, Planktonamor, and Karen the Crystal Ball (voiced by Rodger Bumpass, Clancy Brown, Lori Alan, Carolyn Lawrence, Mr. Lawrence, and Jill Talley) are the medieval counterparts of the main characters who appear in "Dunces and Dragons". The present-day SpongeBob and Patrick are magically transported to their times and help save Princess Pearl from Planktonamor. Planktonamor additionally keeps a pet, the Dragon Jellyfish, who is a giant jellyfish with a mane and a tail.

Reception

The characters of SpongeBob SquarePants have been well-received overall. The titular character SpongeBob has become very popular with children and adults.
The character's popularity has spread from Nickelodeon's original demographic of two- to eleven-year-olds, to teenagers and adults. The popularity of SpongeBob translated well into sales figures. In 2002, SpongeBob SquarePants dolls sold at a rate of 75,000 per week, which was faster than Tickle Me Elmo dolls were selling at the time. SpongeBob has gained popularity in Japan, specifically with Japanese women. Nickelodeon's parent company Viacom purposefully targeted marketing at women in the country as a method of building the SpongeBob SquarePants brand. Skeptics initially doubted that SpongeBob could be popular in Japan as the character's design is very different from already popular designs for Hello Kitty and Pikachu. However, the characters have also attracted some negative reception, including SpongeBob himself, who was listed as number four on AskMen's Top 10: Irritating '90s Cartoon Characters. Nevertheless, SpongeBob SquarePants was ranked ninth on TV Guide'''s top 50 cartoon characters.

The show's characters have received recognition from celebrities and well-known figures in media. Barack Obama named SpongeBob his favorite television character in 2007 and admitted that SpongeBob SquarePants was "the show I watch with my daughters." British Prime Minister Gordon Brown has also said he watches the show with his children. Sigourney Weaver and Bruce Willis were reported to be fans of the SpongeBob character in 2008. Film critic A. O. Scott named Squidward, Mrs. Puff, and Sandy his favorite characters on the show in 2004. American singer Pharrell Williams, who says he is a fan of the show, said that "Squidward is my favorite, though. If he was a human, I would hang out with him." Fashion designer Peter Jensen designed a line of sweatshirts inspired by SpongeBob and called Mrs. Puff his "absolute favorite" character in an interview with Women's Wear Daily. Peter Keepnews of The New York Times commended Patrick, calling him "a popular character, and the new episodes illustrate why: He is unfailingly enthusiastic, touchingly loyal and absolutely undeterred by his intellectual limitations. Hilariously voiced by Bill Fagerbakke, he is not just an endearing comic creation but a role model for idiots everywhere."

The show's voice actors have received attention from honorary organizations for the portrayals of their characters. Mary Jo Catlett and Tom Kenny were both nominated at the 29th Annie Awards ceremony in 2001 for their vocal performances as Mrs. Puff and SpongeBob. Kenny received an additional two nominations at the 2008 and 2010 ceremonies, the latter of which he won for voicing SpongeBob in "Truth or Square". In 2012, Rodger Bumpass' performance as Squidward was nominated for Outstanding Performer in an Animated Program at the 39th Daytime Emmy Awards. Additionally, Patrick as a character won in the category "Favorite Animated Animal Sidekick" at the 2014 Kids' Choice Awards.

Appearances in other media

The characters of SpongeBob SquarePants appeared in the 2004 theatrical film The SpongeBob SquarePants Movie and its 2015 sequel. Both films feature the regular television cast and blend animated elements with live-action sequences. They have also been featured in a variety of associated merchandise, particularly video games; from 2001 to 2013, the SpongeBob franchise had multiple video games released each year, with the show's voice cast reprising their character roles for many titles. Every main cast member with the exception of Clancy Brown has voiced their respective characters in each game that they appear; Brown's character Mr. Krabs is instead voiced by Joe Whyte in SuperSponge, Operation Krabby Patty, and Battle for Bikini Bottom and by Bob Joles in the Truth or Square game.

The SpongeBob characters have been featured at a variety of theme park attractions. In 2003, Kings Island announced plans to build the first SpongeBob-themed amusement park ride, a dark ride roller coaster titled "Mrs. Puff's Crash Course Boating School". Plans were halted when Kings Island changed ownership, and the first ride featuring SpongeBob theming was instead "SpongeBob's Boatmobiles"—also based on Mrs. Puff's Boating School and opened in 2003—at California's Great America. Amusement rides based on the characters have since been opened at Blackpool Pleasure Beach, Dreamworld, Movie Park Germany, and Nickelodeon Universe. Two 4D films featuring 3-D models of the characters and a motion simulator experience, SpongeBob SquarePants 4-D and The Great Jelly Rescue, were sold to theme parks and aquariums worldwide in 2005 and 2013 respectively.

Mascot costumes of the SpongeBob characters debuted at Nickelodeon Suites Resort in 2005 and have made regular appearances at Nickelodeon events since. Plankton, Karen, and Gary are the only main characters who have never been realized as mascots; at events, they are normally depicted as puppets or statues instead. In December 2011, a parade of SpongeBob mascots and floats titled "SpongeBob ParadePants" opened at Sea World Australia. In November 2017, a Broadway musical based on the show began previews at the Palace Theatre, and opened in December 2017. Unlike previous shows, the characters were not represented with mascot costumes but by actors wearing clothing inspired by the characters' designs.

Popular culture
The characters of SpongeBob SquarePants have appeared throughout popular culture. In 2007, the Amsterdam-based company Boom Chicago created a SpongeBob parody called "SpongeBob SquarePants in China", in which a stereotypically Chinese Patrick refuses to go to work and advocates freedom of speech, rights of leisure, and income. During the same year, production company Camp Chaos created a SpongeBob parody titled SpongeBong HempPants, which features five of the series' characters parodied in the form of various drugs. The show was seen on VH1 and Comedy Central, both owned by Nickelodeon's parent company Viacom. Comedy Central's Drawn Together also features a parody of SpongeBob named "Wooldoor Sockbat" whose theme tune is inspired by SpongeBobs Hawaiian-style background music. Two animated series that former SpongeBob writer Dan Povenmire worked on have incorporated references to the characters; the Phineas and Ferb special "Summer Belongs to You" features a joke in which Phineas Flynn holds up inanimate representations of SpongeBob and Patrick, and the Family Guy episode "Road to Rupert" includes SpongeBob's "Campfire Song Song" from "The Camping Episode". SpongeBob, Patrick, Mr. Krabs, Pearl and Squidward all appear in "Major League of Extraordinary Gentlemen", an episode of the sketch comedy Robot Chicken. A segment of the episode, animated in stop motion with SpongeBob toy figures, features Mr. Krabs using crab legs as the secret ingredient for Krabby Patties. SpongeBob has also made cameo appearances in The Simpsons, Mad, The Loud House, South Park and Futurama. In April 2016, Nintendo's Wii U exclusive Splatoon'' released a splatfest based on the eponymous series by teaming two characters SpongeBob and Patrick, hosted by the pop band Squid Sisters: Callie and Marie, the event began for 24 hours and Team Patrick won.

References

Bibliography

 
 
 

SpongeBob SquarePants
 
Characters
SpongeBob SquarePants
SpongeBob SquarePants
SpongeBob SquarePants
SpongeBob SquarePants